Lambert Wilson (born 3 August 1958) is a French actor, singer, and activist. He is best known internationally for his portrayal of The Merovingian in The Matrix Reloaded, The Matrix Revolutions, and The Matrix Resurrections.

Biography

Early life
Wilson is the son of Georges Wilson, who was an actor, theatrical manager and director of the Théâtre National Populaire. As a teenager, he had little interest in the French theatre and aimed to become an "American actor" and appear in Hollywood pictures. He studied acting at the Drama Centre London to learn English. He played his first movie role in the 1977 American film Julia, directed by Fred Zinneman. 

Five years later, he played his first starring role in another film by Zinneman, Five Days One Summer, opposite Sean Connery. But the film was not a commercial success, and neither was Sahara in which Wilson co-starred with Brooke Shields. Wilson ultimately found success in his home country: during the 1980s, he became popular with French audiences by appearing in successful films such as La Boum 2, The Public Woman and Rendez-vous. At the time, he was often cast either as tormented characters or in romantic parts, although he found himself more convincing in the former kind of roles. 

Wilson screen tested for The Living Daylights (1987) for the role of James Bond, appearing in test footage opposite Maryam d'Abo (the Bond girl in The Living Daylights) as Tatiana Romanova, re-enacting scenes from From Russia with Love (1963). In 1991, Wilson was featured in a series of Calvin Klein ads for its Eternity perfume brand, featuring Christy Turlington, reuniting for a poster ad in 1998.

First critical accolades

Wilson released Musicals on the EMI label in 1989 (re-issued in 2004), with John McGlinn conducting Orchestre Philharmonique de Monte-Carlo. It features him singing songs of the American Musical Theatre catalogue, those well-known ("Maria" from West Side Story, "There But For You Go I" from Lerner & Loewe's Brigadoon, "The Cafe Song" from Les Misérables, "Johanna" from Stephen Sondheim's Sweeney Todd), rare ("Love Song" from Kurt Weill and Alan Jay Lerner's Love Life, "It Must Be So" from Leonard Bernstein's Candide, and "Silly People", which was cut from Sondheim's A Little Night Music), and those in-between ("Finishing the Hat" from Sunday in the Park with George, "You Do Something to Me" from Cole Porter's Fifty Million Frenchmen, "Never Will I Marry" from Frank Loesser's Greenwillow).

He has directed stage presentations of Alfred de Musset's Les Caprices de Marianne starring Laure Marsac at Paris' Bouffes du Nord as well as Jean Racine's Bérénice starring Kristin Scott Thomas and Didier Sandre at Avignon and then Chaillot.

In 1989, his performance as Abbé Pierre in the film Hiver 54, l'abbé Pierre, for which he received the Jean Gabin prize, won him critical accolades. In the late 1980s and early 1990s, however, his screen career suffered from a series of box office failures, such as The Possessed and El Dorado.

He later said that the French producers had come, at the time, to regard him as "box office poison". He eventually won back the favour of French audiences by appearing in the successful comedies Same Old Song (1997) and Jet Set (2000).

Wilson was cast in the role of The Merovingian in The Matrix Reloaded (2002) and The Matrix Revolutions (2003), perhaps his best-known role in the American cinema. Being completely fluent in English, his strong French accent in the film is fabricated for the role. The role also popularised the Ediety tie knot, now commonly referred to as "The Merovingian".

Recent years

In November 2012, he was selected as a member of the main competition jury at the 2012 International Film Festival of Marrakech. In April 2013, Wilson was invited by MINUSTAH (United Nations Stabilization Mission in Haiti) to visit Haiti in the capacity of helping with various UN-backed environment and cultural programmes.

He was the master of ceremonies for the opening and closing ceremonies of the 2014 and 2015 Cannes Film Festival.

In February 2016, he released a tribute album called Wilson chante Montand to the singer Yves Montand to commemorate the 25th anniversary of the death of the artist. Among the 17 tracks on the album there is Mais qu’est-ce que j’ai ? which was composed by Henri Betti with the lyrics by Édith Piaf in 1947. The musical arrangements of the 17 songs were made by Bruno Fontaine. Also in 2016, he portrayed Jacques Cousteau in the biopic The Odyssey.

Wilson's commitment to safeguarding the environment is manifest in his support of Greenpeace and Agir pour l'Environnement amongst others. He works on behalf of the Fondation Abbé-Pierre and the Mouvement Emmaüs in France to eradicate hunger and poverty. Wilson is an ambassador for Les Toiles Enchantées (an association that brings contemporary cinema to hospitals and hospices for children), and parrain (patron) for a proposed new cinema at the Institut Français in London.

Wilson is Chevalier and Officier des Arts et des Lettres and Chevalier and Officier de l'Ordre National du Mérite. He was raised to Commandeur de l’Ordre du Mérite by President Emmanuel Macron in 2017.

In January 2018 he engaged to assist the Food and Agriculture Organisation of the United Nations (FAO) in communications regarding work to eradicate world hunger and poverty ("Working for Zero Hunger"). The same year he starred in Volontaire by Hélène Fillières.

In 2021, Wilson reprised his role of The Merovingian from The Matrix franchise in The Matrix Resurrections.

Filmography

Film

Television

Video games

References

External links

1958 births
Living people
French male film actors
French male television actors
20th-century French male actors
21st-century French male actors
French LGBT actors
Bisexual male actors
French people of Irish descent
People from Neuilly-sur-Seine
Alumni of the Drama Centre London